Revelations is the fifth album by the Polish death metal band Vader. It was released in 2002 by Metal Blade Records. The release was preceded by the single "Angel of Death" which was released on 10 April 2002. The album was nominated for a Fryderyk Award in the category 'Heavy Metal Album of the Year (Album roku - heavy metal)'. The working title of the album was Epitaph.

Revelations was recorded between February and March 2002 at Red Studio in Gdańsk, Poland, and was produced by Piotr Wiwczarek. The album was mastered by Bartłomiej Kuźniak at Studio 333 in Częstochowa, Poland. It features guest appearances from Polish metal musicians Nergal of Behemoth who provides vocals on the track "Whisper", and Ureck of Lux Occulta who plays keyboards on the tracks: "Torch of War" and "Revelation of Black Moses."

A music video was shot for the song "Epitaph".

Track listing

Personnel
Production and performance credits are adapted from the album liner notes.

 Vader
 Piotr "Peter" Wiwczarek – rhythm guitar, lead guitar, bass guitar, lead vocals, production
 Maurycy "Mauser" Stefanowicz – lead guitar
 Konrad "Saimon" Karchut – bass guitar (credited, did not perform)
 Krzysztof "Doc" Raczkowski – drums

 Additional musicians
 Adam "Nergal" Darski (Behemoth) – guest backing vocals
 Jerzy "U.reck" Głód (Lux Occulta) – guest keyboards
 Jacek Hiro (Sceptic) – guest lead guitar

 Production
 Piotr Łukaszewski – sound engineering
 Bartłomiej Kuźniak – mastering 
 Jacek Wiśniewski – cover art, layout
 Massive Management – photos
 Łukasz Szurmiński – lyrics
 Paweł Frelik – lyrics

 Note
Recorded and mixed at Red Studio, Gdańsk, February/March 2002. 
Premastered & mastered at Studio 333, Częstochowa

"Angel of Death" 

"Angel of Death" is the fourth single by the Polish death metal band Vader. It was released only in Poland on 10 April 2002 by Empire Records. The release features two songs "When Darkness Calls", Thin Lizzy cover "Angel of Death", studio report, and multimedia presentation with 44 photos.

Main part of studio report shows drums recording, and equipment setup by Krzysztof "Doc" Raczkowski. The video consists also introduction by engineer Piotr Łukaszewski, interview with Piotr "Peter" Wiwczarek, Maurycy "Mauser" Stefanowicz guitar warming up, with addition of guest appearance by keyboardist Jerzy "U.reck" Głód from Lux Occulta.

Track listing

Charts

Weekly

Monthly

Release history

References

Metal Mind Productions albums
Vader (band) albums
2002 albums
Metal Blade Records albums